Kalima Center for Dialogue and Cooperation (KCDC) is an academic and religious institution in the Shiite holy city of Najaf which represents the religious and scientific heritage of Najaf. The center hosts academics, strategic experts, journalists, and representatives of civil society in order to foster mutual respect between religious and non-religious societies.

History
The opportunity for expanding the religious and cultural dialogue in iraq became available after the regime change in 2003 .
The KCDC is non-governmental and was founded by Grand Ayatollah Al Sayyed Mohammed Said Al-Hakeem.

The Aims 

	Building communication bridges between societies .
	Open up the horizons of cooperation between religious and scientific institutions in Holy Najaf on one side and cultural, scientific organizations of the world on the other side .
	Understanding religious and cultural particulars of humanitarian groups .
	Benefiting from successful humanitarian experience .

Achievements  

	A sequence of dialogues in cultural and religious field .
	Several conferences and symposiums internal and external of Iraq .
	Traveling of tens of academic between Iraq and external world .

References 
 
 صحيفة دنيا الوطن تتحدث عن مركز الحكمة للحوار والتعاون  .
 سفارة جمهورية العراق في برلين  .
 مؤسسة النور للثقافة والاعلام .
 موقع حقائق .
 صحيفة صوت العراق الالكترونية  .
 مؤسسة اليتيم الخيرية  .
 موقع شفقنا نيوز   .
 موقع كتابات في الميزان .
 شبكة اخبار النجف.
 مكتب المرجع الديني محمد سعيد الحكيم .
 وكالة انباء براثا   .
 وكالة النجف نيوز .
 صحيفة المرايا الالكترونية  .
 صحيفة اللواء  .
 الموقع الايزيدي (بحزاي).

Religious organizations based in Iraq
Najaf